"Need Your Love So Bad", sometimes known as "I Need Your Love So Bad", is a song first recorded by Little Willie John in 1955. Called a "unique amalgam of gospel, blues and rhythm & blues", it was John's second single as well as his second record to reach the US charts.

The song is one of John's best known and appears on various compilation albums. In 1968, Fleetwood Mac recorded a version of the song, which reached the singles chart in the UK and the Netherlands.

Composition and recording
"Need Your Love So Bad" follows an AABA form and a harmonic layout typical for the R&B ballad. However, the song has been described as "A tightly wound and intense plea for love... quite different from the usual R&B ballad fare".

John recorded the song in New York City on September 20, 1955. He provides the vocal, accompanied by Robert "Bubber" Johnson on piano, Mickey Baker on guitar, Milton Hinton on bass, Calvin Shields on drums, Willis Jackson and David Van Dyke on tenor saxes, and Reuben Phillips on baritone sax.

Songwriting credits and releases
There are differing accounts of the songwriting credits. The original King Records release lists the writer as "Willie John" as do the original Blue Horizon and CBS Records singles by Fleetwood Mac. However, some compilations show the writer as Mertis John, Willie's brother. A 2001 biography of Little Willie John includes: 

The American performing rights organization BMI attributes the song to both William Edward John and Mertis John Jr. (Little Willie's and his brother's legal names).

King Records released John's single, which reached No. 5 on the Billboard R&B in 1956 and the B-side "Home at Last" reached No. 6 in the same chart. As one of John's most popular tunes, it has been included on various compilation albums, such as Fever: The Best of Little Willie John (1993) and The Very Best of Little Willie John (2001).

Renditions by other artists

Fleetwood Mac

In 1968, Fleetwood Mac recorded "Need Your Love So Bad" for producer Mike Vernon's Blue Horizon Records.  According to Vernon, he suggested to group guitarist and vocalist Peter Green that a string section be added. Vernon contacted Mickey Baker, who provided the guitar on John's original version, to write an orchestral score for the song. 

The song was released as a single, backed with "Stop Messin' Round", and reached No. 31 on the UK Singles Chart in August 1968, and No. 7 in the Netherlands. Later in the UK, it was reissued as a single by Blue Horizon (designated as the A-side with "No Place to Go" as the B-side) and CBS as part of its "Hall of Fame Hits" series (designated as the B-side with "Albatross" as the A-side).

The song is included on several Fleetwood Mac compilation albums, including The Pious Bird of Good Omen (1969), Greatest Hits (1971), and others. In 1999, The Complete Blue Horizon Sessions 1967–1969 was released with additional takes of the song. One included additional guitar and vocal overdubs by Green that was planned for an American single, but never issued.

Gary Moore
In 1995, guitarist and singer Gary Moore recorded the song for Blues for Greeny (1995), a tribute album to Peter Green, who sang and played guitar on Fleetwood Mac's rendition. Moore's version was also released as a single in June 1995 and reached No. 48 on the UK Singles Chart.

References

1955 songs
Blues songs
Fleetwood Mac songs
1955 singles
1968 singles
King Records (United States) singles